Tamara Antonovna Ivanyutina (née Maslenko, 1941–1987) was a Soviet serial killer. She was the target of a wide scale investigation in Kyiv during the 1980s.

Biography 
Tamara Maslenko was born in a large family as one of six children, in which her parents always told her that material security is the main thing in life. Although forensic psychiatric examination recognized Ivanyutina as sane, she was noted as self-centered, vindictive and resentful. During the investigations into the poisonings, it turned out that Ivanyutina had been convicted of speculation, and obtained employment in her school by the use of a fake employment record book, because as a former convict she wasn't allowed to work in educational institutions.

Chemistry teacher Viktor Stadnik, who suffered from Ivanyutina's actions, noted such traits of her character as "perseverance and arrogance", as well as rudeness and lack of discipline.

Murders 
Between March 17 and 18, 1987, several pupils and employees of School #16 in the Podilskyi District in Kiev were hospitalized with signs of food poisoning. Two children - Sergei Panibrat and Andrei Kuzmenko - and two adults died almost immediately, while the remaining 9 people were in intensive care. Doctors initially suspected influenza or an intestinal infection, but some time later, the hair began to fall out from the victims, which is not typical for such diseases.

Poisoning was suspected, and a criminal investigation and an investigative team was established. The investigators, after interviewing the survivors, found out that they all felt unwell by having lunch the day before in the school cafeteria, after eating kasha and liver. When the question arose if there was quality control in the school canteen, it was found that a dietitian named Natalia Kukharenko (according to other sources - Kukarenko) had died two weeks before the events, according to official data - from a heart disease. However, the circumstances of Kukharenko's death caused doubts in the investigators, and due to this her body was exhumed. As a result of corresponding studies, traces of thallium were found in corpse tissues. After that, searches were carried out for all persons who have access to the kitchen, including in the house Tamara Ivanyutina lived, who worked as a dishwasher in the dining room of School N#16.

During the search, a "small but very heavy jar" was found in Ivanyutina's house. It interested operatives and investigators and was sent for examination afterwards. A laboratory study showed that the can contained "Clerici solution" - a highly toxic solution based on thallium used in some branches of geology.

Ivanyutina was arrested and initially wrote a confession, confessing to the poisoning in the school canteen on March 16, 1987. The reason for the crime, according to Ivanyutina, was that the sixth graders who dined in the dining room refused to set up tables and chairs, and "she decided to punish them". However, she later stated that the confessions were made up from investigators who pressured her, and refused to give further testimony.

Investigation 
Further investigation of the "Ivanyutina-Maslenko-Matzobory case" showed that Ivanyutina and her family (sister and parents) used thallium for poisoning for 11 years (since 1976); and did not poison as a mercenary goal, but simply because of personal dislikes. The family members purchased the substance from a friend who worked at the geological institute, explaining to her that the poison was for killing rats. The acquaintance admitted that for 15 years she had not less than nine times given Ivanyutina, her sister and parents a portion of the substance.
At the beginning of her criminal activities, Ivanyutina poisoned her first husband to get his apartment. After his death, she married a second time, but then poisoned her father-in-law and mother-in-law (died at intervals of two days), later poisoning her second husband in small portions (the purpose was to take possession of her husband parents' house with a plot of land).

In September 1986, Ivanyutina got a job as a dishwasher for the school. According to investigators, she needed this work in order to gain access to food and food waste, since she kept a large farm with pigs and chickens. During her time in the dining room, Ivanyutina poisoned (in addition to the previous poisonings) the school party organizer Ekaterina Arsentyevna Scherban (died) and the chemistry teacher (survived) who prevented her from stealing food from the canteen, and two first and fifth grade students (both survived), who had asked her for the remnants of cutlets for their pets.

The investigation proved that Tamara's elder sister, Nina Matzobory, using the same solution, had poisoned her husband and taken possession of their Kiev apartment. Numerous poisonings were committed by their parents as well: in particular, they killed a neighbor in a communal apartment and a cousin, who made remarks about them.

While detained, Maria Maslenko explained her life position to her cellmates: "To achieve what you want, you do not need to write complaints, but to treat everybody as friends. But for especially harmful ones, just add poison to food". The geography of the criminal activities of the family was not limited to Ukraine; it was proven that some of the crimes committed by them in the RSFSR; in particular, her father Anton, while in Tula, poisoned his cousin by mixing poison in her moonshine. Also, members of the family also poisoned neighbors' pets.

Trial and sentence 
45-year-old Tamara Ivanyutina, her older sister Nina Matzobory, as well as their parents - Anton Mitrofanovich and Maria Fedorovna Maslenko, appeared before the court on charges of committing numerous poisonings, including fatalities. The investigators and the court found that the family for 11 years, in selfish interests, and also personal hostility, committed numerous murders and attempted murders to kill various persons by poisoning them.

According to the current deputy chairman of the Constitutional Court of Ukraine, S.M. Vinokurov, who worked during the investigation as a senior investigator for particularly important cases in the city prosecutor's office in Kiev, proving that this was the largest case of thallium poisonings fixed in the USSR. In total, 40 cases of poisonings committed by the family were proven, 13 of which were fatal. At the same time, the largest number of poisonings (9) and assassination attempts (20) was committed personally by Tamara Ivanyutina. The trial lasted about a year, Ivanyutina did not admit her guilt and refused to apologise to the victims' families. All defendants were found guilty of murder and attempted assassination committed through poisoning.

Execution 
Ivanyutina was sentenced to death and executed in 1987. Her accomplices were sentenced to various terms of imprisonment: Nina was sentenced to 15 years (her further fate is unknown) and their parents to 10 and 13 years, both dying in custody. During the investigation, Ivanyutina admitted that her dream was to buy a GAZ car. She also tried to bribe an investigator, promising him "a lot of gold". Refusing to admit her guilt, she explained at her trial that she did not have "a good upbringing".

This unusual case was one of only three confirmed instances of a woman executed in the post-Stalin Soviet Union – the others were the 1979 execution of Antonina Makarova for her activities on the WWII Eastern Front, and the 1983 execution of Berta Borodkina for embezzlement and bribery. Ivanyutina's case is still included in Ukraine's training materials for criminal procedures.

In the media 

 The documentary series "The investigation was conducted ..." - "Poisonous school" (issue No. 205, June 16, 2012), NTV.

See also
List of serial killers by country

References

External links 

 

1941 births
1987 deaths
Executed mass murderers
Executed Russian women
Executed Soviet female serial killers
Executed Ukrainian serial killers
Mariticides
Murderers of children
People executed by the Soviet Union by firearm
Poisoners
Ukrainian female serial killers
Ukrainian mass murderers